The land of Sin or Sinim (from: , i.e. the inhabitants of the land of Sin, or the people of Sin) is a biblical hapax legomenon that appears in Isaiah 49:12: "Behold, these shall come from far: and, lo, these from the north and from the west; and these from the land of Sinim."

Some English versions simply transliterate the word, others translate the Hebrew as Syene or Aswan, and still others associate Sin with China. Sinim resembles Sinae, the Latinization of Qin, after the Qin state, founded in 778 BC, and the Qin dynasty, founded in 221 BC by Qin Shi Huang-Di.

Young's Analytical Concordance to the Bible (1879) defines the word as "a people in the far east; the Chinese?" The International Standard Bible Encyclopedia (1915) says, "The land is clearly far off, and it must be sought either in the South or in the East. Septuagint points to an eastern country. Many scholars have favored identification with China, the classical Sinae. It seems improbable that Jews had already found their way to China; but from very early times trade relations were established with the Far East by way of Arabia and the Persian Gulf; and the name may have been used by the prophet simply as suggesting extreme remoteness....While no certain decision is possible, probability points to the East, and China cannot be quite ruled out." Modern translations of the Bible tend to translate Sinim as Syene (ancient Aswan) because the Great Isaiah Scroll of the Dead Sea Scrolls uses that word.

In language nearly identical to that of the King James Version, First Nephi 21:12 in the Book of Mormon reads: “And then, O house of Israel, behold, these shall come from far; and lo, these from the north and from the west; and these from the land of Sinim.” The index of this scripture of the Church of Jesus Christ of Latter-day Saints defines Sinim as “possibly [the] land of China”.

References

External links
Article arguing that Sinim is an ancient Semitic/Phoenician name for Australia
A NOVA article claiming that Sinim refers to China

Hebrew Bible places